The Civil Aviation Department (CAD) is the civil aviation authority of Hong Kong, headquartered at Hong Kong International Airport. The department is responsible for providing air traffic control services to all aircraft operating within the Hong Kong Flight Information Region. It reports to the Transport and Logistics Bureau of the Hong Kong Government. The current Director-General of Civil Aviation is Victor Liu Chi-yung.

The CAD was also responsible for managing the former Hong Kong International Airport at Kai Tak, until it was retired and replaced by the new Hong Kong International Airport managed by the Airport Authority.

During British rule, CAD was not a sub-unit of the British Civil Aviation Authority. Since 1997, CAD maintains independence from the Civil Aviation Administration of China.

History
The CAD was established on 1 May 1946.

In 2018, responsibility for investigation of aircraft accidents was transferred to the newly formed Air Accident Investigation Authority (AAIA).

Structure
CAD includes the following divisions:

Deputy Director-General of Civil Aviation (1)
Flight Standards and Airworthiness Division 
Air Traffic Management Division
Air Traffic Engineering Services Division
Airport Standards Division 

Deputy Director-General of Civil Aviation (2)
Air Services and Safety Management Division
Administration Division 
Finance Division

Facilities
The agency is headquartered at Hong Kong International Airport on Chek Lap Kok. Previously it was on the 46th floor of the Queensway Government Offices.

Safety concerns
In late 2016, CAD introduced a new air traffic system which attracted concerns over the increased risk of safety within Hong Kong airspace. On 8 February, a FactWire investigation showed that there were 6 cases of safety incidents involving “loss of separation” in January 2017 due to technical issues with CAD's new air traffic management system (ATMS).  5 of the cases occurred during peak-time Lunar New Year holidays, and were resolved internally. As a comparison, it was noted that only 10 incidents of "loss of separation" occurred per year under the previous system, with such cases being treated as very serious due to the risk of mid-air collision. After criticism of not having announced the 6 "LOS" incidents, CAD released a statement on their website to clarify that all incidents were classified as "minor" internally.

See also

 Airport Authority Hong Kong
Hong Kong International Airport
 Civil Aviation Authority of Macau SAR
 CAAC Flight 301
 China Airlines Flight 642

References

External links
 
 
 Flight Information Region In Hong Kong

Hong Kong
Hong Kong government departments and agencies
Aviation organisations based in Hong Kong
Organizations investigating aviation accidents and incidents
Civil aviation in Hong Kong
1946 establishments in Hong Kong